The Wonder Where Stakes is a Canadian Thoroughbred horse race run annually since 1965 at Woodbine Racetrack in Toronto, Ontario. Held during the end of July/first week in August, it is the third leg of Canadian Triple Tiara series for Canadian-foaled three-year-old fillies.

Raced on Turf, the Wonder Where Stakes currently offers a purse of Can$250,000. Since inception in 1965, it has been contested at  miles (10 furlongs) except for 1994 when the distance was set at  miles (9 furlongs).

The race is named in honor of the champion filly, Wonder Where, Canada's 1959 Horse of the Year and a Canadian Horse Racing Hall of Fame inductee.

In 2007, Sealy Hill became the first filly to win the Canadian Triple Tiara since the series was created in 1999.

Records
Speed  record: 
 1:58.88 - Inflexibility (2017)

Most wins by an owner:
 7 - Sam-Son Farm (1972, 1985, 1990, 1991, 1996, 2000, 2013)

Most wins by a jockey:
 4 - Todd Kabel (1993, 1994, 1998, 2002)
 5 - Patrick Husbands (2007, 2009, 2011, 2014, 2015)

Most wins by a trainer:
 4 - James E. Day  (1985, 1990, 1991, 1996)
 4 - Roger Attfield  (1986, 1988, 1999, 2001)
 4 - Mark Casse (2007, 2009, 2014, 2015)

Winners

* In 1973, Square Angel finished first but was disqualified and set back to second.

References
 The Wonder Where Stakes at Pedigree Query

Restricted stakes races in Canada
Turf races in Canada
Flat horse races for three-year-old fillies
Recurring sporting events established in 1965
Woodbine Racetrack
Summer events in Canada